Gwydir Forest, also spelled Gwydyr, is located in Conwy county borough and the Snowdonia National Park in Wales.  It takes its name from the ancient Gwydir Estate, established by the John Wynn family of Gwydir Castle, which owned this area.

Natural Resources Wales uses the alternative spelling (i.e. Gwydyr Forest, Coedwig Gwydyr).  Certainly as early as 1536, Leland wrote: "Gwydir lieth two bowshots above the River Conwy. It is a pretty place."

Geography of the forest 

The forest broadly encircles the village of Betws-y-Coed, and much of its midsection lies within the parish. It reaches northwards to the village of Trefriw, and southwards to the village of Penmachno.

Certainly there would have been a certain amount of natural tree growth on these hills thousands of years ago.  More recently, records from the 18th century refer to the rafting of timber down the River Conwy.  In the 19th century use was made of the quay at Trefriw for the shipment of timber to the coast.  In 1778, referring to Carreg-y-Gwalch, just above Gwydir Uchaf, Thomas Pennant was told that "the noblest oaks in all Wales grew on this rock within living memory."

Despite being a forest, much of it is not dark and enclosed, and it offers fine views over these valleys, with further views to the mountains of the Glyderau, the Carneddau and the Snowdon massif itself.

The forested areas occupy the steep slopes and poorer soils of the plateau, the best of the soil being in the agricultural valley bottoms.  Rainfall in the forest varies from under  to over  p.a.

The forest is home to numerous lakes, all of which are reachable by footpaths, and nearly all of which were created to serve the mines of the Forest.  In order of size, these include:

 Llyn Crafnant  —on the northern edge of the forest
 Llyn Geirionydd 
 Llyn Elsi 
 Llyn Parc 
 Llyn Glangors 
 Llyn Bodgynydd 
 Llyn Goddionduon 
 Llyn Pencraig 
 Llyn Bychan 
 Llyn Sarnau 
 Llyn Tynymynydd 
There are also a number of smaller, unnamed lakes.

Forestry operations 
Following the Forestry Act of 1919, Gwydir Forest was established by the Forestry Commission in 1921, after much of the land was acquired from Lord Ancaster, whose family had inherited the Wynn estate.  The First World War had highlighted a shortage in wood production, and left the area with little natural woodland.  Many of the early planters and forestry workers had no experience of forestry, being formerly employed in the forest's mines, and many anecdotes from this era can be found in the book Tales from the Gwydyr Woods.  Millions of seedlings were grown in the Diosgydd nursery, and the first areas planted were those that previously had some coverage.  Most of the original plantations have now been felled and replanted as part of the forestry cycle.

The majority of the forest is conifer (Sitka spruce, Douglas fir, Japanese larch, Norway spruce and Scots pine), relatively suited to the area's poor, shallow soils, but recent years have seen the increased planting of native broadleaf species such as Welsh Oak, beech and ash.  This has largely been done for aesthetic reasons, i.e. to produce variety and to reduce the hard lines produced by conifers.  However, commercial reasons will always dictate the need for faster-growing conifers.  These have a plant-harvest cycle of between 20 and 40 years (depending on type), whereas oak requires the best part of a century.

The forest still gives direct employment to 75 people, and creates local work for many others.  It is estimated that the forest is growing at a rate of 125 tons a day, and is naturally being harvested at much the same rate.  At times rights of way in the forest may be closed or restricted where forestry work is being undertaken. Further information about the forest and its operations can be obtained by telephoning the Forest Office at Gwydir Uchaf (01492 640578).  This property was built by Sir John Wynn in 1604.

Tourism
The land owned by Natural Resources Wales in Snowdonia National Park amounts to just over 12%, and of the four forest areas, the Gwydir Forest is probably the most popular based on visitor numbers.  In 1937 Gwydir was designated a National Forest Park, and since 1993 the heartland of the forest has been accorded the special status of Forest Park.  Promotion as an attraction has been an integral part of this designation.

The forest is very accessible by wide tracks, old miners' paths, and long-established forest walks, a number of which follow waymarked routes.

However, there are a number of forest car parks and most of these have picnic sites. The forest was used as a special stage in the 2013 Wales Rally GB.

The former mines 

Today the forest is dotted with the remains of former metal mines: old engine houses, waste tips, reservoirs, and the surface remains of the pits themselves.  This, however, is nothing compared to the labyrinth of tunnels below the surface, which run to scores of miles in length.  Predominantly lead and zinc were mined, and the heyday of metal mining in the forest was between 1850 and 1919, although mining on a small scale began in the early 17th century.  Indeed, whilst evidence is difficult to find following centuries of subsequent mining work, it is more than likely that a certain amount of shallow mining was undertaken by the Romans—the Roman road of Sarn Helen passed through the forest.

The principal mines were those of:
 Parc Mine
 Hafna Mine
 Llanrwst Mine
 Cyffty Mine
 Pandora Mine
 Aberllyn Mine

These lie in the central part of the forest around the area known as Nant Bwlch-yr-haearn.

Parc Mine was the largest and most successful of these mines. It opened in 1855 as the Gwydyr Park Consols and was worked intermittently up to the 1940s. By World War II it was the only mine to be still working. It reopened in 1950, and it produced more lead and zinc ore between 1953 and 57 than the whole of the Llanrwst area in the century from 1848. Despite some subsequent modernisation it closed down in c.1960.

The first four of the mines listed above have been linked by the "Miners Trail", a circular route marked with information boards.  Their remains can also easily be seen from the unclassified road that runs from Gwydir Castle (on the B5106 road) via Nant Bwlch-yr-haearn to the Ugly House on the A5.

Mention has already been made of the numerous lakes in the forest, and indeed in this central area they were all, almost without exception, created or enlarged to provide reservoirs for the mine workings.  In most cases water was run from these via leats, which turned water-wheels to power machinery on site.

On acquisition of the land by the then Forestry Commission, efforts were made to make former mine workings safe, and before increased public access further extensive works were carried out by the National Park Authority, with funding from the Welsh Development Agency and support from the Conservation Council (now the Countryside Council for Wales, the Welsh Mines Society, and Gwynedd Archaeological Trust. Given the opportunities that the wealth of tunnels below the mines offers, it is hoped that future identification of safe areas will allow the re-opening of some areas for limited access.

Much has been written about the mines, most notably a series of 7 books called Mines of the Gwydyr Forest.

Rare plants and animals 

The piles of rock waste on the former mine sites have proved to be ideal breeding grounds for rare plants, and have resulted in the designation of part of the forest as a Site of Special Scientific Interest (SSSI).  This very specialised group of plants are known as metallophytes, being found only around old metal workings.  They are able to extract minerals from the rock that would kill other species.  Principal species found on the Gwydir mine sites are pennycress and forked spleenwort.

The capping of the mine shafts for safety reasons has resulted in an ideal environment for bats, and the designation of a Special Area of Conservation (SAC).  In February 2001 a lesser horseshoe bat (Rhinolophus hipposideros) was found hibernating in a disused mine in the forest, the furthest north in the UK that this species had been found.  The bat had been ringed as a juvenile in 1999 in the Forest of Dean.

Despite a lack of photographic evidence, there have been over 100 reported sightings of pine martens in north Wales in the last decade, and pine marten DNA was recovered from a dropping found in Gwydir Forest in 1996.

See also
Caerdroia § Gwydir Forest
Grey Mare's Tail - waterfall
Klondyke mill

Notes

References 
Tales from the Gwydyr Woods, by D.L.Shaw (published by the Forestry Commission, 1977).
Mines of the Gwydyr Forest (a series of 7 books), by John Bennett & Robert W. Vernon (published by Gwydir Mines Publications, 1989–1997).
Gwydir Forest Park Miners Trail, a leaflet published by Forest Enterprise.

External links 
 Places to visit: Gwydir Forest Park (Natural Resources Wales site)
 Mountain Biking in the Gwydyr Forest (Marin Trail) - MBWales
 Gwydir Castle
  Introduction to the Lead mines of the Gwydyr Forest
 Labyrinth in the Woods

Betws-y-Coed
Bro Machno
Capel Curig
Dolwyddelan
Trefriw
Forests and woodlands of Conwy County Borough
Tourist attractions in Conwy County Borough
Forests and woodlands of Snowdonia
Rally GB